O.co can refer to:

 O.co Coliseum, a stadium in Oakland
 Overstock.com, an online retailer that formerly branded itself as O.co